Janghanpyeong Station is a station on Seoul Subway Line 5 in Dongdaemun-gu, Seoul.

Station layout

References 

Seoul Metropolitan Subway stations
Railway stations opened in 1995
Metro stations in Dongdaemun District
Metro stations in Seongdong District